Promises Treatment Centers are a for-profit provider of residential drug and alcohol rehabilitation that started out with facilities in Malibu and West Los Angeles, California.  It was founded by Richard Rogg in 1989 and acquired by David Sack of Elements Behavioral Health in 2008. Elements, who filed for bankruptcy in 2018, operates locations in other areas, however the California locations have closed.
 
For its treatment method, Promises used the term "Malibu Model" which it registered in 2004 as a service mark. The Malibu Model differs from traditional models by allowing patients more liberty and providing privatized treatment, in contrast to regular rehab involving peer groups, never leaving the facility, and limited visitors.  Promises' clientele included actress Lindsay Lohan singer Britney Spears, and others.

References

External links
Promises

Drug and alcohol rehabilitation centers
Addiction organizations in the United States
Companies based in Tennessee
Mental health organizations in Tennessee